The 1976 Spanish motorcycle Grand Prix was the twelfth and final round of the 1976 Grand Prix motorcycle racing season. It took place on 19 September 1976 at the Circuito del Montjuïc.

350 cc classification

250 cc classification

125 cc classification

50 cc classification

References

Spanish motorcycle Grand Prix
Spain
Motorcycle Grand Prix